Lisa Kathleen Honan (previously Phillips)  was the Governor of Saint Helena, Ascension and Tristan da Cunha from 25 April 2016 until 4 May 2019, when she was replaced by Philip Rushbrook. She is the first, and currently only, female to have held the post. Honan was previously Head of Office in Kenya for the Department for International Development, and after holding the post in St Helena went on to be Head of the DFID Office in Nepal.  She resigned from there in August 2021 ending a career lasting 46 years in international development.

Lisa Honan joined the Overseas Development Administration in 1975 as a Clerical Officer.  She joined from secondary school with GCSEs only.  Leaving in 2021, she was the only member of the Senior Civil Service to have not attended university or studied for A levels. She also failed her 11plus.

Lisa Honan was appointed Commander of the Order of the British Empire in the 2016 Queen's Birthday Honours List for services to international aid.

She met and married Detective Sergeant David Honan on St Helena in 2018.

References 

Commanders of the Order of the British Empire
Governors of Saint Helena
British diplomats
British colonial governors and administrators in Africa
Living people
Place of birth missing (living people)
Year of birth missing (living people)